Amol Palekar (born 24 November 1944) is an Indian actor, director and producer of Hindi and Marathi cinema.

Career
Palekar studied fine arts at the Sir J. J. School of Art, Mumbai, and commenced his artistic career as a painter. As a painter, he had seven one-man exhibitions and participated in many group shows. However, Palekar is better known as a stage and film actor. He has been active in the avant garde theatre in India in Marathi and Hindi theatre as an actor, director and producer since 1967. His contribution to the modern Indian theatre is often overshadowed by his popularity as a lead actor in Hindi films.

As a film actor, he was most prominent in the 1970s. His image as a "boy next door" contrasted with the larger-than-life heroes prevalent at that time in Indian cinema. He received one Filmfare award and six State awards as Best Actor. His performances in regional language films in Marathi, Bengali, Malayalam and Kannada fetched him critical acclaim as well. He decided not to act after 1986 in order to concentrate on filmmaking.

As a director, he is known for the sensitive portrayal of women, selection of classic stories from Indian literature, and perceptive handling of progressive issues. He has directed several television serials on the national network such as Kachchi Dhoop, Mrignayani, Naquab, Paool Khuna and Krishna Kali.

Theatre journey
Palekar began in Marathi experimental theatre with Satyadev Dubey, and later started his own group, Aniket, in 1972. As a theatre actor, he was part of popular plays like Shantata! Court Chalu Aahe, Hayavadana and Adhe Adhure. Following a performance on stage at the National Centre for the Performing Arts (India) (NCPA) in 1994, he returned to theatre after a gap of 25 years with the suspenseful play, Kusur (The Mistake). This play is directed by him and he also plays the lead role.

Movie career

Palekar made his debut in 1971 with the Marathi film Shantata! Court Chalu Aahe directed by Satyadev Dubey, which started the New Cinema Movement in Marathi.
In 1974 he was cast as an actor by Basu Chatterjee in Rajnigandha, and in the surprise low-budget hit, Chhoti Si Baat. This led to many other such roles in "middle-class" comedies, mostly alternative. These were mostly directed by Chatterjee or Hrishikesh Mukherjee and included films such as Gol Maal and Naram Garam. He won the Filmfare Best Actor Award for Gol Maal.

He is noted for his image of the "middle-class everyman" who struggles to get a job (Gol Maal), his own flat (Gharonda), a girlfriend/wife (Baaton Baaton Mein), and appreciation from his boss.

In 1979, he was paired with a sixteen-year-old Sridevi in Solva Saawan, which was her debut Hindi movie as a heroine. Amol played the role of an intellectually disabled man, a character played by Kamal Haasan in the original Tamil movie.

In 1982 he played the role of Ravi in the Malayalam movie Olangal. He turned to directing with the Marathi film Aakriet. He showed his capabilities as a director with movies such as Thodasa Roomani Ho Jaayen and Paheli. Thodasa Roomani Ho Jaayen has become a part of management courses and study pertaining to human behaviour. Paheli was India's official entry for Best Foreign Film at the 2006 Oscars. The movie, however, did not make it to the final nominations.

He has also given his voice to an HIV/AIDS education animated software tutorial created by the nonprofit organization TeachAids. He is willing to act once again if he is given a challenging role.

Personal life
Amol Palekar was born to Kamlakar and Suhasini Palekar in a lower-middle-class family in Mumbai. He was raised along with his three sisters, Neelon, Rekha and Unnati, by his father who worked in the General Post Office and his mother, who worked in a private company. He worked at the Bank of India before he switched full-time to a career in acting. He also does some social work. He married Sandhya Gokhale after his divorce from his first wife, Chitra. Palekar regards himself as an agnostic atheist.

In February 2022, Palekar was hospitalized in Pune for COVID-19 related complications.

Filmography

As an actor

As a director
  Aakreit (Unimaginable in Marathi) – 1981
 Ankahee (Unspoken) – 1985
 Thodasa Rumani Ho Jaye – 1990
 Bangarwadi – 1995
 Daayraa (The Square Circle) – 1996
 Anahat (Forever)
 Kairee (Raw mango) – 2001
 Dhyaas Parva (Kal Kaa Aadmi in Hindi) – 2001 (based on Raghunath Karve's life, won the National Award for Best Film on Family Welfare)
 Paheli (Riddle) – 2005 (India's official entry to the 78th Academy Awards for Best Foreign Language Film) 
 Quest (English) – 2006 (won the National Film Award for Best Feature Film in English)
 Dumkata (2007)
 Samaantar (Marathi) – 2009
 ...And Once Again – 2010
 Dhoosar (Marathi) – 2011 (won the Maharashtra State Film Award)

Feature films in other regional languages
 Mother (Bengali) (with Sharmila Tagore & Dipankar Dey)
 Kalankini (Bengali) (with Mamata Shankar – directed by Dhiren Ganguly)
 Chena Achena (Bengali) (with Tanuja & Soumitra Chatterjee)
 Kanneshwara Rama (Kannada) (with Anant Nag & Shabana Azmi – directed by M.S. Sathyu)
 Paper Boats (Kannada & English) (with Deepa – directed by Pattabhirama Reddy)
 Olangal (Malayalam) (with Poornima Jayaram & Ambika – directed by Balu Mahendra)

TV serials
 Kachchi Dhoop – 1987
 Naqab – 1988
 Paoolkhuna – 1993
 Mrignayanee – 1991
 Kareena Kareena – 2004
 AA Bail Mujhe Maar – 1987
 Ek Nayi Ummeed-Roshni – 2015

Web series

Awards

Reality television shows
 lokesh

References

External links

 

1944 births
Living people
Palekar, Amol
Palekar, Amol
Indian atheists
Hindi-language film directors
Male actors in Marathi cinema
Marathi film directors
Palekar, Amol
Palekar, Amol
Male actors from Mumbai
Sir Jamsetjee Jeejebhoy School of Art alumni
20th-century Indian male actors
Indian agnostics
Male actors from Pune
21st-century Indian film directors
Film directors from Mumbai
Special Jury Award (feature film) National Film Award winners
Directors who won the Best Film on Family Welfare National Film Award
Directors who won the Best Film on Other Social Issues National Film Award
Filmfare Awards winners